WWE Network is a Canadian English language specialty channel programmed by WWE and distributed by Rogers Sports & Media. Its programming consists entirely of the linear feed offered as part of the WWE Network video streaming service.

History and distribution
The channel launched on August 12, 2014, using a dedicated channel within the existing Sportsnet PPV licence, similar to how Rogers initially distributed the Sportsnet World service. The channel is offered on a subscription basis on Rogers Cable and, according to Rogers, has been offered to all other cable, satellite, and IPTV service providers across Canada. Rogers has indicated that other providers have shown interest in carrying the channel, but that negotiations are ongoing and may "take some time".

Rogers also sponsored an application by WWE to the Canadian Radio-television and Telecommunications Commission (CRTC) to add the WWE Network (U.S.) linear channel as a non-Canadian programming service authorized for distribution, which will ultimately replace the Rogers-operated PPV channel. This application was published on September 10, 2014, and was open for public comment until October 10.

The launch of WWE Network in Canada as a traditional cable TV channel is part of an exclusive Canadian distribution agreement between Rogers and WWE, which runs through 2024, and includes Rogers' Sportsnet 360 retaining exclusive rights to WWE's weekly programming (E!'s reality series Total Divas, which airs on its Canadian counterpart, owned by Bell Media, was not affected by this agreement). This means that Rogers controls the Canadian distribution of WWE Network and will not immediately be making it available on an over-the-top basis (i.e. without going through a service provider such as Rogers), though Rogers has not ruled out making it available via over-the-top (OTT) in the future.

On November 26, 2014, The CRTC approved adding the WWE Network to the list of non-Canadian programming services authorized for distribution (the list), part of the approval for the WWE Network. Rogers confirmed that the WWE Network service that it proposed to distribute in Canada would broadcast the same content as that broadcast by the WWE Network service in the United States and that the service would complement its other offerings, such as various sporting programs on Sportsnet 360 and live events on pay-per-view.

On December 17, 2014, the network launched on Eastlink, making it the first provider other than Rogers to carry it. On February 12, 2015, Rogers announced a carriage agreement with Cogeco, Shaw, Vidéotron and Telus. It launched for Telus TV, Videotron, Bell Satellite TV and Bell Fibe TV on February 25, Cogeco Cable on March 24, and Shaw and Shaw Direct on March 17.

As of March 9, 2015, those who have subscribed to the WWE Network, via a cable or satellite provider, can now access it through the over-the-top streaming service at http://Watch.WWE.com. This service is currently available to Rogers, Eastlink, and Optik TV subscribers, with more to be added in the future. As of late 2015 Sasktel has begun carrying the WWE Network.

On March 23, 2017, WWE Network On Demand launched on Bell Fibe TV On Demand, Fibe TV App, Bell Satellite TV On Demand and Bell Aliant Fibe TV On Demand.

As of October 1, 2021, WWE Network became available as a standalone service in Canada through Rogers' Sportsnet Now over-the-top streaming service.

Programming

The channel itself carries approximately 20 hours of programming each day, seven days a week, drawn directly from the U.S. streaming service's linear channel. The subscription also includes access to a video on demand library with a limited number of offerings, accessible via cable set-top box (somewhat similar to the former WWE Classics on Demand package), but does not currently provide access to the Internet-based on-demand library.

See also

New Japan Pro Wrestling World
Professional wrestling in Canada

References

External links
 

WWE Network
Television channels and stations established in 2014
Sports television networks in Canada
Sportsnet
Rogers Communications
English-language television stations in Canada
Digital cable television networks in Canada
Professional wrestling in Canada
Professional wrestling streaming services
WWE in Canada
2014 establishments in Canada